Farhad Moshiri may refer to:

Farhad Moshiri (artist) (born 1963), Iranian artist
Farhad Moshiri (businessman) (born 1955), London-based businessman